Philippe Henri Maxime Vigier (8 June 1924, Paris – 15 March 1995, Paris) was a 20th-century French historian, specialist of the French Second Republic.

Selected works 
1963: La Seconde République dans la région alpine, Paris, Presses universitaires de France, 2 vol.
1976: La Monarchie de Juillet, Paris, Presses universitaires de France, coll. Que sais-je?, 127 p.
1982: La Vie quotidienne en province et à Paris pendant les journées de 1848, Paris, Hachette, 443 p. 
2001: La Seconde République, Paris, Presses universitaires de France, coll. Que sais-je?, 127 p.

References

External links 
 Philippe Vigier on data.bnf.fr
 Philippe Vigier, historien de la Seconde République
 La Seconde République dans la région alpine (report) on Persée
 La monarchie de Juillet. (report) on Persée 

1924 births
1995 deaths
20th-century French historians
French historiographers
French Second Republic
Writers from Paris